The eye-ringed tody-tyrant (Hemitriccus orbitatus) is a species of bird in the family Tyrannidae. It is endemic to Brazil. Its natural habitat is subtropical or tropical moist lowland forest. It is becoming rare due to habitat loss.

References

Birds of the Atlantic Forest
Hemitriccus
Endemic birds of Brazil
Birds described in 1831
Taxonomy articles created by Polbot